The Anti-Federalist League was a small party organisation in Britain, formed in 1991 by Alan Sked to campaign against the Maastricht Treaty. It was effectively the forerunner of the United Kingdom Independence Party. The League contested seventeen constituencies at the 1992 general election and Sked contested two by-elections in 1993.

General election, 9 April 1992

Source:

By-elections, 1993

See also
 UK Independence Party election results

References

UK Independence Party
Election results by party in the United Kingdom